The Ministry of Infrastructure Development of Tanzania is responsible for coordinating and financing the development of the infrastructure of the country. Its mandate includes marine, aviation, roads, and other construction projects, and its responsibilities include working with the National Assembly in creating budgets and long-term project planning. 

Ministry offices are located in Dar es Salaam. The Minister of Infrastructure Development is

Organization and operations

The work of the ministry is broadly organized into departments, authorities, agencies and institutions.

Departments
Departmental work within the ministry itself is organized into: 
Roads Division
Transport Division
Safety and Environment Unit
...and many various administrative divisions and units.

The responsibilities of the ministry are devolved to a number of authorities and agencies.

Authorities
Tanzania Airports Authority
Tanzania Civil Aviation Authority
Tanzania Ports Authority
Surface and Marine Transport Regulatory Authority

Agencies
Air Tanzania
Architects and Quantity Surveyors Registration Board
Contractors Registration Board 
Engineers Registration Board 
National Board for Materials Management
National Construction Council
Tanzania Building Agency
Tanzania Clearing and Forwarding Agency
Tanzania Electrical Mechanical & Electronics Services
Tanzania Government Flight Agency
Tanzania Government Stores
Tanzania National Roads Agency
Tanzania Railway Corporation
Tanzania Zambia Railway

Institutions
Related institutions within the Tanzanian government include:
Appropriate Technology Training Institute
Dar es Salaam Maritime Institute
National Institute of Transport

See also
Economy of Tanzania
Government of Tanzania
Transport in Tanzania

References

Infrastructure Development
Transport in Tanzania